Comasco or Comasque is a dialect of Western Lombard language spoken in the city and suburbs of Como. It belongs to the Comasco-Lecchese group.

Characteristics 
Generally, it has harder sounds than other dialects.

See also

References

External links 

 

Western Lombard language